San José de Sisa is a town in Northern Peru, capital of the province El Dorado in the region San Martín.

Populated places in the San Martín Region